The Karpeles Manuscript Library Museum is a museum in Jacksonville, Florida, one of fifteen Karpeles Manuscript Library Museums in the United States, all housed in repurposed old buildings. Other locations of Karpeles Museums include Buffalo, NY; Charleston, SC; Duluth, MI; Newburgh, NY; Santa Barbara, CA; Tacoma, WA; Shreveport, LA; Fort Wayne, IN; Alvin, TX; Rock Island, IL; St. Louis, MO; Gloversville, NY; Pittsburgh, PA; and Great Falls, MT. Karpeles Manuscript Library Museums display manuscripts and documents from the private collection of David and Marsha Karpeles, the world's largest such collection, as well as art exhibits. 

The museum opened in 1992 in the former First Church of Christ, Scientist building in Jacksonville's Springfield neighborhood. The Classical Revival structure, constructed in 1921, is a contributing property in the Springfield Historic District and is listed as No. SP-61 by the Jacksonville Historic Landmarks Commission.

Building
Overlooking Henry J. Klutho Park and Hogans Creek, this impressive former church building stands at the entrance to Springfield. Its construction with an imposing Neo-Classical Revival facade highlighted by monumental Doric columns was a departure from the more usual ecclesiastical styles such as Gothic Revival, Romanesque Revival, Spanish, and others constructed in the same era. It is also unusual among churches for lacking both a steeple and a bell tower. The construction of this sanctuary in 1921 cost $80,000. The architecture firm responsible for its design was Marsh & Saxelbye, and W.D. Gerbrich was the builder.[1]

The first Christian Science services in Jacksonville were held in 1892 and First Church of Christ, Scientist was organized in 1897. It met at several locations in Jacksonville before acquiring the property that would be its permanent home in the Springfield area in 1921. The building, located at 101 West 1st Street (formerly 1116 North Laura Street), was built in the Classical Revival style. A contributing building in the Springfield Historic District, it is listed as No. SP-61 by the Jacksonville Historic Landmarks Commission.

In 1992 the congregation sold the building to David Karpeles. After the sale the church was voluntarily dissolved August 10, 1993.

Karpeles Museum
The Jacksonville Karpeles Manuscript Library Museum opened in 1992. It is privately owned by David Karpeles, a former math professor who made millions investing in real estate before taking up manuscript collecting. In 1983 he began opening museums across the country to house his collection, now the world's largest. The museum features three or four exhibits from Karpeles' collection a year, as well as exhibits from other collectors and around six art exhibits.

The museum maintains the building's original features, many reflecting it status as a church. These features include large stained glass windows, an altar area, and upstairs gallery seating. There are also relics left behind by the building's former occupants, including a piano and a collection of books that the museum has turned into a sort of special library, allowing visitors to sit in a comfortable chair while reading. As previously owned by Christian Scientists, the books are mostly religious or medical in nature though there are also many classics.

After 30 years, the museum is set to close in 2023.

See also
List of former Christian Science churches, societies and buildings

References

External links

1992 establishments in Florida
Art museums and galleries in Florida
Churches completed in 1921
Churches in Jacksonville, Florida
Former Christian Science churches, societies and buildings in Florida
Historic district contributing properties in Florida
Laura Street
Libraries in Florida
Literary museums in the United States
Museums in Jacksonville, Florida
National Register of Historic Places in Jacksonville, Florida
Religious organizations established in 1897